The Governor's Trophy was awarded annually by the International Hockey League to the most outstanding defenseman as judged by league coaches. It was first awarded in 1965, and renamed the Larry D. Gordon Trophy in 1999. It was awarded 38 times, to 33 different players;  Jim Burton was a three-time recipient,

Winners

Notes

References

External links
 Governor's Trophy www.hockeydb.com
 Larry D. Gordon Trophy www.hockeydb.com
 Larry D. Gordon Trophy www.azhockey.com

International Hockey League (1945–2001) trophies